Sakhno is a Ukrainian surname. Notable people with this surname include:

 Ivanna Sakhno (born 1997), Ukrainian actress
 Roman Sakhno (born 1990), Ukrainian footballer
 Viktor Sakhno (born 1961), Ukrainian footballer

See also
 

Ukrainian-language surnames